SMS  was a battlecruiser of the German  (Imperial Navy) built in the early 1910s during the Anglo-German naval arms race. The s were larger and featured significant improvements over the previous German battlecruisers, carrying larger guns in a more efficient superfiring arrangement.  was armed with a main battery of eight  guns, compared to the  guns of earlier battlecruisers.

 was completed shortly after the outbreak of World War I in 1914; after entering service, she joined the other German battlecruisers in I Scouting Group of the High Seas Fleet, where she served for the duration of the conflict. As part of this force, she took part in numerous operations in the North Sea, including the Raid on Scarborough, Hartlepool and Whitby in December 1914, the Battle of Dogger Bank in January 1915, and the Bombardment of Yarmouth and Lowestoft in April 1916.

The ship rejoined the fleet in late 1916, though by this time the Germans had abandoned their strategy of raids with the surface fleet in favor of the U-boat campaign. As a result,  and the rest of the High Seas Fleet saw little activity for the last two years of the war apart from patrol duty in the German Bight. The fleet conducted one final operation in April 1918 in an unsuccessful attempt to intercept a British convoy to Norway. After the end of the war in November 1918, the fleet was interned in Scapa Flow. On the order of Rear Admiral Ludwig von Reuter, the interned ships were scuttled on 21 June 1919 to prevent them from being seized by the Allied powers.

Design

The  class was authorized for the 1911 fiscal year as part of the 1906 naval law; design work had begun in early 1910. To keep costs from growing too quickly, the number of guns was reduced from ten to eight, compared to the earlier , but a more efficient superfiring arrangement was adopted.

Characteristics

The ship had a crew of 44 officers and 1,068 enlisted men. In early August 1915, a derrick was mounted amidships, and tests with Hansa-Brandenburg W seaplanes were conducted.

 was propelled by two pairs of high- and low-pressure steam turbines that drove four screw propellers, with steam provided by fourteen coal-burning water-tube boilers ducted into two funnels.

Mounting a main battery of eight 30.5 cm (12 in) guns,  was the largest and most powerful German battlecruiser at the time. The ship's secondary battery consisted of twelve  SK L/45 guns in single casemates in the superstructure, six per broadside. For defense against torpedo boats, she carried eight  SK L/45 guns in individual pivot mounts on the superstructure, four of which were removed in 1916. An additional four 8.8 cm flak guns were installed amidships. Four  submerged torpedo tubes were carried; one was located in the bow, two on the broadside, and one in the stern.

Her secondary casemates received  of armor protection. The forward conning tower, where the ship's commander controlled the vessel, had 300 mm walls.

Service

Built by Blohm & Voss at their yard in Hamburg, s keel was laid down in January 1912. The ship was named for Georg von Derfflinger, a Prussian field marshal during the Thirty Years' War. She was to have been launched on 14 June 1913, and at the launching ceremony, the German General August von Mackensen gave a speech. The wooden sledges upon which the ship rested became jammed; the ship moved only . A second attempt was successful on 12 July 1913. A crew composed of dockyard workers took the ship around the Skagen to Kiel in early 1914; there she would complete fitting out. As Europe drifted toward war during the July Crisis, the German naval command issued orders on the 27th placing the fleet on a state of heightened alert, though  was not yet complete. The Germans feared that the Russian Baltic Fleet would launch a surprise torpedo-boat attack at the start of the war, as the Japanese navy had done to the Russians in the Russo-Japanese War, but the attack did not materialize when World War I broke out the next day.

The ship was placed in commission on 1September to begin sea trials. In late October, the vessel was assigned to I Scouting Group, but damage to the ship's turbines during trials prevented her from joining the unit until 16 November. They failed to locate any British forces and thereafter returned to port.

Bombardment of Scarborough, Hartlepool, and Whitby

s first combat operation was a raid on the English coastal towns of Scarborough, Hartlepool, and Whitby. One raid had already been conducted by the battlecruisers of I Scouting Group, on the town of Yarmouth in late 1914. Admiral Friedrich von Ingenohl, the commander of the High Seas Fleet, decided to conduct another raid on the English coast. His goal was to lure a portion of the Grand Fleet into combat where it could be isolated and destroyed. At 03:20 on 15 December, Rear Admiral Franz von Hipper, with his flag aboard , departed the Jade estuary. The ships sailed north past the island of Heligoland, until they reached the Horns Reef lighthouse, at which point they turned west towards Scarborough. Twelve hours after Hipper left the Jade, the High Seas Fleet departed to provide distant cover. The main fleet consisted of 14 dreadnoughts, eight pre-dreadnoughts and a screening force of two armored cruisers, seven light cruisers, and fifty-four torpedo boats.

On 26 August 1914, the German light cruiser  had run aground in the Gulf of Finland; the wreck was captured by the Russian navy, which found code books used by the German navy, along with navigational charts for the North Sea. The Russians passed these documents to the Royal Navy, whose cryptographic unit—Room 40—began decrypting German signals. On 14 December, they intercepted messages relating to the planned bombardment of Scarborough. The exact details of the plan were unknown, and the British assumed the High Seas Fleet would remain safely in port, as in the previous bombardment. Vice Admiral David Beatty's four battlecruisers, supported by the 3rd Cruiser Squadron and the 1st Light Cruiser Squadron, along with the 2nd Battle Squadron's six dreadnoughts, were to ambush Hipper's battlecruisers.

During the night of 15 December, the main body of the High Seas Fleet encountered British destroyers. Fearing a nighttime torpedo attack, Admiral Ingenohl ordered the ships to retreat. Hipper was unaware of Ingenohl's reversal, and so he continued with the bombardment. By 09:45 on the 16th, the two groups had reassembled, and they began to retreat eastward.

By this time, Beatty's battlecruisers were positioned to block Hipper's chosen withdrawal route, while other forces were en route to complete the encirclement. At 12:25, the light cruisers of II Scouting Group began to pass through the British forces searching for Hipper. One of the cruisers in the 2nd Light Cruiser Squadron spotted  and signaled a report to Beatty. At 12:30, Beatty turned his battlecruisers towards the German ships. Beatty presumed the German cruisers were the advance screen for Hipper's ships; however, those were some 50 km (31 mi) ahead. The 2nd Light Cruiser Squadron, which had been screening for Beatty's ships, detached to pursue the German cruisers, but a misinterpreted signal from the British battlecruisers sent them back to their screening positions. This confusion allowed the German light cruisers to slip away and alerted Hipper to the location of the British battlecruisers. The German battlecruisers wheeled to the northeast of the British forces and escaped.

Both the British and the Germans were disappointed that they failed to effectively engage their opponents. Admiral Ingenohl's reputation suffered greatly as a result of his timidity. s captain was furious; he said Ingenohl had turned back "because he was afraid of 11 British destroyers which could have been eliminated... under the present leadership we will accomplish nothing." The official German history criticized Ingenohl for failing to use his light forces to determine the size of the British fleet, stating: "he decided on a measure which not only seriously jeopardized his advance forces off the English coast but also deprived the German Fleet of a signal and certain victory."

Battle of Dogger Bank

In early January 1915, the German naval command became aware that British ships were reconnoitering in the Dogger Bank area. Admiral Ingenohl was initially reluctant to attempt to destroy these forces, because I Scouting Group was temporarily weakened while  was in drydock for periodic maintenance. Richard Eckermann, the Chief of Staff of the High Seas Fleet, insisted on the operation, and so Ingenohl relented and ordered Hipper to take his battlecruisers to the Dogger Bank. Each light cruiser had a half-flotilla of torpedo boats attached.

Again, interception and decryption of German wireless signals played an important role. Although they were unaware of the exact plans, the cryptographers of Room 40 deduced that Hipper would be conducting an operation in the Dogger Bank area.

At 08:14,  spotted the light cruiser  and several destroyers from the Harwich Force. Aurora challenged  with a search light, at which point  attacked Aurora and scored two hits. Hipper immediately turned his battlecruisers towards the gunfire, when, almost simultaneously,  spotted a large amount of smoke to the northwest of her position. This was identified as a number of large British warships steaming towards Hipper's ships.

At 10:28, Lion was struck on the waterline, which tore a hole in the side of the ship and flooded a coal bunker. Beatty ordered his battlecruisers to engage their German counterparts. During this period of the battle,  was hit once, but the shell did only minor damage. Two armor plates in the hull were forced inward and some of the protective coal bunkers were flooded.

At 10:40, one of Lions  shells struck  causing nearly catastrophic damage that knocked out both rear turrets and killed 159 men. The executive officer ordered both magazines flooded to avoid a flash fire that would have destroyed the ship. By this time, the German battlecruisers had zeroed in on Lion, scoring repeated hits. At 11:01, an  shell from  struck Lion and knocked out two of her dynamos. At 11:18, two of   shells hit Lion, one of which struck the waterline and penetrated the belt, allowing seawater to enter the port feed tank. Lion had to turn off its engines due to seawater contamination and as a result fell out of the line.

By this time,  was severely damaged after having been pounded by heavy shells. The chase ended when there were several reports of U-boats ahead of the British ships; Beatty quickly ordered evasive maneuvers, which allowed the German ships to increase the distance to their pursuers. The severely damaged warship capsized and sank at approximately 13:10. By the time Beatty regained control over his ships, after having boarded Princess Royal, the German ships had too great a lead for the British to catch them; at 13:50, he broke off the chase.

Bombardment of Yarmouth and Lowestoft

 also took part in the bombardment of Yarmouth and Lowestoft on 24–25 April 1916. Hipper was away on sick leave, so the German ships were under the command of Konteradmiral Friedrich Boedicker. , her newly commissioned sister ship , and the veterans ,  and  left the Jade Estuary at 10:55 on 24 April. They were supported by a screening force of six light cruisers and two torpedo boat flotillas. The heavy units of the High Seas Fleet, under the command of Admiral Reinhard Scheer, sailed at 13:40, with the objective to provide distant support for Boedicker's ships. The British Admiralty was made aware of the German sortie through the interception of German wireless signals, and deployed the Grand Fleet at 15:50.

By 14:00, Boedicker's ships had reached a position off Norderney, at which point he turned his ships northward to avoid the Dutch observers on the island of Terschelling. The four remaining battlecruisers turned south immediately in the direction of Norderney to avoid further mine damage. By 16:00,  was clear of imminent danger, so the ship stopped to allow Boedicker to disembark.

Boedicker refused to be distracted by the British ships, and instead trained his ships' guns on Lowestoft.

At 05:20, the German raiders turned north, towards Yarmouth, which they reached by 05:42. The German ships turned back south, and at 05:47 encountered for the second time the Harwich Force, which had by then been engaged by the six light cruisers of the screening force. Tyrwhitt immediately turned his ships around and fled south, but not before the cruiser  sustained severe damage. Due to reports of British submarines and torpedo attacks, Boedicker broke off the chase and turned back east towards the High Seas Fleet. At this point, Scheer, who had been warned of the Grand Fleet's sortie from Scapa Flow, turned back towards Germany.

Battle of Jutland

Almost immediately after the Lowestoft raid, Scheer began planning another foray into the North Sea. He had initially intended to launch the operation in mid-May, but the mine damage to  had proved difficult to repair, and Scheer was unwilling to embark on a major raid without his battlecruiser forces at full strength.

 and the rest of Hipper's I Scouting Group battlecruisers lay anchored in the outer Jade roadstead on the night of 30 May.

An hour and a half later, the High Seas Fleet left the Jade; the force was composed of 16 dreadnoughts. The six pre-dreadnoughts of II Battle Squadron had departed from the Elbe roads at 02:45, and rendezvoused with the battle fleet at 05:00.

Run to the south

Shortly before 16:00, Hipper's force encountered the six ships of Vice Admiral Beatty's 1st and 2nd Battlecruiser Squadrons. When the British ships began returning fire, confusion among the British battlecruisers resulted in  being engaged by both New Zealand and Tiger. The British rangefinders had misread the range to their German targets, and so the first salvos fired by the British ships fell a mile past the German battlecruisers. Due to errors in British communication,  was not engaged during the first ten minutes of the battle. s gunnery officer,  Georg von Hase later remarked "By some mistake we were being left out. I laughed grimly and now I began to engage our enemy with complete calm, as at gun practice, and with continually increasing accuracy."

Observers on New Zealand and Tiger, the ships behind and ahead respectively, reported three shells from a salvo of four struck the ship at the same time. Two more hits followed, and a gigantic explosion erupted amidships; a billowing cloud of black smoke poured from the burning ship, which had broken in two. The leading ships of the German High Seas fleet had by 18:00 come within effective range of the British battlecruisers and Queen Elizabeth-class battleships and had begun trading shots with them. At 18:55,  was hit again; this shell struck the bow and tore a hole that allowed some 300 tons of water to enter the ship.

Battlefleets engage

Shortly after 19:00, the German cruiser  had become disabled by a shell from the battlecruiser ; the German battlecruisers made a 16-point turn to the northeast and made for the crippled cruiser at high speed. Hipper initially hesitated, believing the ship was the German cruiser , but at 19:16,  Harder, s commanding officer, ordered his ships' guns to fire. The other German battlecruisers and battleships joined in the melee; Defence was struck by several heavy-caliber shells from the German ships. One salvo penetrated the ship's ammunition magazines and a massive explosion destroyed the cruiser.

By 19:24, the 3rd Battlecruiser Squadron had formed up with Beatty's remaining battlecruisers ahead of the German line. In return, both  and  concentrated their fire on their antagonist, and at 19:31  fired her final salvo at Invincible. Shortly thereafter the forward magazine detonated and the ship disappeared in a series of massive explosions.

By 19:30, the High Seas Fleet, which was by that point pursuing the British battlecruisers, had not yet encountered the Grand Fleet. Scheer had been considering retiring his forces before darkness exposed his ships to torpedo boat attack. He had not yet made a decision when his leading battleships encountered the main body of the Grand Fleet. This development made it impossible for Scheer to retreat, for doing so would have sacrificed the slower pre-dreadnought battleships of II Battle Squadron. If he chose to use his dreadnoughts and battlecruisers to cover their retreat, he would have subjected his strongest ships to overwhelming British fire. Instead, Scheer ordered his ships to turn 16 points to starboard, which would bring the pre-dreadnoughts to the relative safety of the disengaged side of the German battle line.

 and the other battlecruisers followed the move, which put them astern of the leading German battleship, . Hipper's badly battered ships gained a temporary moment of respite, and uncertainty over the exact location and course of Scheer's ships led Admiral Jellicoe to turn his ships eastward, towards what he thought was the likely path of the German retreat. The German fleet was instead sailing west, but Scheer ordered a second 16-point turn, which reversed course and pointed his ships at the center of the British fleet. Three minutes later, the German battlecruisers turned in retreat, covered by a torpedo boat attack.

Withdrawal

A pause in the battle at dusk (approximately 20:20 to 21:10) allowed  and the other German battlecruisers to cut away wreckage that interfered with the main guns, extinguish fires, repair the fire control and signal equipment, and prepare the searchlights for nighttime action. During this period, the German fleet reorganized into a well-ordered formation in reverse order, when the German light forces encountered the British screen shortly after 21:00. The renewed gunfire gained Beatty's attention, so he turned his battlecruisers westward. At 21:09, he sighted the German battlecruisers, and drew to within  before opening fire at 21:20. In the ensuing melee,  was hit several times; at 21:34, a heavy shell struck her last operational gun turret and put it out of action. The German ships returned fire with every gun available, and at 21:32 hit both Lion and Princess Royal in the darkness.
 

The maneuvering of the German battlecruisers forced the leading I Battle Squadron to turn westward to avoid collision. This brought the pre-dreadnoughts of II Battle Squadron directly between the two lines of battlecruisers. In doing so, this prevented the British ships from pursuing their German counterparts when they turned southward. The British battlecruisers opened fire on the old battleships; the German ships turned southwest to bring all their guns to bear against the British ships. This engagement lasted only a few minutes before Admiral Mauve turned his ships 8 points to starboard; the British inexplicably did not pursue.

Close to the end of the battle, at 03:55, Hipper transmitted a report to Admiral Scheer informing him of the tremendous damage his ships had suffered. Hipper reported: "I Scouting Group was therefore no longer of any value for a serious engagement, and was consequently directed to return to harbor by the Commander-in-Chief, while he himself determined to await developments off Horns Reef with the battlefleet."

During the course of the battle,  was hit 17 times by heavy caliber shells and nine times by secondary guns. She was in dock for repairs until 15 October.  fired 385 shells from her main battery, another 235 rounds from her secondary guns, and one torpedo. Her crew suffered 157 men killed and another 26 men wounded; this was the highest casualty rate on any ship not sunk during the battle. Because of her stalwart resistance at Jutland, the British nicknamed her "Iron Dog".

Later operations

After returning to the fleet,  conducted battle readiness training in the Baltic Sea for the rest of October and all of November. By this time, the Germans had abandoned offensive use of the surface fleet, favoring instead the U-boat campaign against British merchant shipping.  and the rest of the fleet were used to defend German waters so the U-boats could continue to operate. During the Second Battle of Heligoland Bight in November 1917,  sailed from port to assist the German light cruisers of II Scouting Group, but by the time she and the other battlecruisers arrived on the scene, the British raiders had fled northward. On 20 April 1918,  covered a minelaying operation off Terschelling.

Beginning in late 1917, the High Seas Fleet had begun to conduct raids on the supply convoys between Britain and Norway. In October and December, German cruisers and destroyers intercepted and destroyed two British convoys to Norway. This prompted Beatty, now the Commander in Chief of the Grand Fleet, to detach several battleships and battlecruisers to protect the convoys. This presented to Scheer the opportunity for which he had been waiting the entire war: the chance to isolate and eliminate a portion of the Grand Fleet. Hipper planned the operation: the battlecruisers, including , and their escorting light cruisers and destroyers, would attack one of the large convoys, while the rest of the High Seas Fleet stood by, ready to attack the British battleship squadron.

At 05:00 on 23 April 1918, the German fleet departed from the Schillig roadstead. Hipper ordered wireless transmissions be kept to a minimum to prevent radio intercepts by British intelligence. Despite this setback, Hipper continued northward. By 14:00, Hipper's force had crossed the convoy route several times but had found nothing. At 14:10, Hipper turned his ships southward. By 18:37, the German fleet had made it back to the defensive minefields surrounding their bases. It was later discovered that the convoy had left port a day later than expected by the German planning staff.

Fate

While the fleet was consolidating in Wilhelmshaven, war-weary sailors began deserting en masse. As  and  passed through the locks that separated Wilhelmshaven's inner harbor and roadstead, some 300 men from both ships climbed over the side and disappeared ashore.

On 24 October 1918, the order was given to sail from Wilhelmshaven. Starting on the night of 29 October, sailors mutinied on several battleships; three ships from III Squadron refused to weigh anchor, and the battleships  and  reported acts of sabotage. The order to sail was rescinded in the face of this open revolt. The following month, the German Revolution toppled the monarchy and was quickly followed by the Armistice that ended the war.

Following Germany's capitulation, the Allies demanded that the majority of the High Seas Fleet be interned in the British naval base at Scapa Flow pending an ultimate resolution of their fate. On 21 November 1918, under the command of Rear Admiral Ludwig von Reuter, the ships sailed from their base in Germany for the last time. The fleet rendezvoused with the light cruiser , before meeting a flotilla of 370 British, American, and French warships for the voyage to Scapa Flow. Once the ships were interned, their breech blocks were removed, which disabled their guns.

The fleet remained in captivity during the negotiations that ultimately produced the Versailles Treaty. It became apparent to Reuter that the British intended to seize the German ships on 21 June 1919, which was the deadline by which Germany was to have signed the peace treaty. Unaware the deadline had been extended to 23 June, Reuter ordered his ships be sunk. On the morning of 21 June, the British fleet left Scapa Flow to conduct training maneuvers. With the majority of the British fleet away, Reuter transmitted the order to his ships at 11:20.  sank at 14:45. The ship was raised in 1939 and was anchored, still capsized, off the island of Risa until 1946, at which point the ship gained the dubious distinction of having spent more time afloat upside down than she had right way up.  was then sent to Faslane Port and broken up by 1948. One of the ship's bells was delivered to the German Federal Navy on 30 August 1965; the other is exhibited outside St Michael's Roman Catholic Church on the Outer Hebrides island of Eriskay.

Notes

Footnotes

Citations

References

Further reading

 
 
 
 
 

Derfflinger-class battlecruisers
World War I battlecruisers of Germany
Ships built in Hamburg
1913 ships
World War I warships scuttled at Scapa Flow
Maritime incidents in 1919